is the third compilation album released by Rimi Natsukawa on . It features duets from Natsukawa's discography, and re-arrangements of her songs into duet versions.

The title is a pun on the English word "Limits" and Natsukawa's first name. A similar pun appears on the track "Hohoemi ni Shite (RiMidori Ver.)," a merge between the first names of Natsukawa and contributing duet partner, Midori Karashima.

Song sources

The majority of songs are new, duet versions of tracks sung with their authors. Of these, two were pre-existing: "Nada Sōsō (Special Live Version)" was released as a single in 2003, and "Warabigami (Tida Chichi Version)," which was on her Famureuta EP in 2003.

Two songs were previously released compilation tracks. "Boku no Mune de Oyasumi," a collaboration with Chikuzen Sato (who had written "Tokotowa no Uta" from Ayakaji no Ne), was originally released on his album The Selection of Cornerstones 1995-2004 (released 2005). "Manten no Hoshi no Yoru" with Kaoru Kurosawa of The Gospellers was released on his Love Anthem album (2005). The song was written in collaboration with fellow Gospellers' member Yutaka Yasuoka.

Track listing

Japan sales rankings

References

Rimi Natsukawa albums
2006 compilation albums
Victor Entertainment compilation albums